Charge contrast imaging is a scanning electron microscope imaging mode which can produce images of otherwise invisible microstructures in insulating materials and in fossils.  While the technique clearly illustrates changes in minerals which reflect genuine compositional differences, the method by which such phenomena occur is not understood.  It is thought to involve the interaction of several electronic forces, including the incoming electrons emitted by the SEM machine, local charge variations in the sample being imaged, the flow of ions in the sample, and any electric fields existing; these may be controlled by structures within the sample which assist in the accumulation of charge.

References

Electron microscopy